Gabriel Davis (born April 1, 1999) is an American football wide receiver for the Buffalo Bills of the National Football League (NFL). He played college football at UCF and was drafted by the Bills in the fourth round of the 2020 NFL Draft.

Early years
Davis attended Seminole High School in Sanford, Florida. While there, he played high school football. As a senior, he had 69 receptions for 1,347 yards and 17 touchdowns, earning him First-team Florida Class 8A All-State honors. He committed to the University of Central Florida (UCF) to play college football.

College career
As a true freshman at UCF in 2017, Davis played in and started all 13 games, recording 27 receptions for 391 yards and four touchdowns. As a sophomore in 2018, he started 12 of 13 games and had 53 receptions for 815 yards and seven touchdowns. He returned as a starter his junior year in 2019. After the season, Davis entered the 2020 NFL Draft.

College statistics

Professional career 

The Buffalo Bills selected Davis in the fourth round with the 128th overall pick in the 2020 NFL Draft.

2020 season
Davis signed a four-year, $3.99 million contract, including a $699,000 signing bonus, with the Bills on May 8, 2020. In Week 2, against the Miami Dolphins, he scored his first professional touchdown on a six-yard reception from Josh Allen. The following week, Davis would catch four passes for a career-high 81 yards. During week four, Davis caught one pass, a 26-yard touchdown from Josh Allen. In Week 12 against the Los Angeles Chargers, Davis recorded three catches for 79 yards, including a 20-yard touchdown reception from fellow wide receiver Cole Beasley during the 27–17 win. Overall, Davis finished his rookie season with 35 receptions for 599 receiving yards and seven receiving touchdowns.

During the Wild Card Round of the playoffs against the Indianapolis Colts, Davis caught four passes for 85 yards, including two sideline grabs that set up Buffalo's second touchdown, as the Bills won 27–24, their first playoff win in 25 years.

2021 season
In Week 10 against the New York Jets, Davis caught all three of his targets for 105 yards, a season high. Overall in the 2021 season, Davis appeared in 16 games, of which he started four. He had 35 receptions on 63 targets for 539 yards and six touchdowns, as the Bills finished the regular season with a 11-6 record to win the AFC East for a second consecutive season. In the Wild Card Round, he caught two passes for 41 yards and a touchdown in Buffalo's 47-17 rout of the New England Patriots.

In the Divisional Round against the Kansas City Chiefs, Davis had a breakout performance, catching a career-high 201 yards on eight catches, and scoring an NFL record four receiving touchdowns in a playoff game during the 42–36 overtime loss. He became just the ninth player in NFL history to record 200+ receiving yards in a playoff game.

2022 season
During Week 5 against the Pittsburgh Steelers, Davis finished with 171 receiving yards and two touchdowns. Davis had a career-high 98-yard touchdown catch in the first quarter and a one-handed catch for a 62-yard touchdown four drives later as the Bills won 38–3. Davis's 98-yard catch tied the record for longest touchdown reception in franchise history.

NFL career statistics

Regular season

Postseason

References

External links
Buffalo Bills bio
UCF Knights bio

1999 births
Living people
Sportspeople from Sanford, Florida
Players of American football from Florida
African-American players of American football
American football wide receivers
UCF Knights football players
Buffalo Bills players
21st-century African-American sportspeople